Albert Kemp may refer to:
 Albert Kemp (rugby league, fl. 1926–27), rugby league player for Castleford
 Albert Kemp (rugby), rugby union and rugby league player in the 1890s and 1900s
 Albert Edward Kemp, Canadian businessman and politician